Maria Memon is a Pakistani TV journalist, newscaster, currently working as an anchor for ARY News.

Before joining the news media, she graduated with a degree in software engineering from Hamdard University, Karachi, Pakistan.

Professional career 
A software engineer turned journalist, Maria Memon is currently working as an anchor for ARY News. She started her journalism career as a junior reporter from the Karachi Bureau and was promoted as the mainstream news anchor in a very brief span of time.

Maria has worked as a coordinator for Najam Sethi's show on Geo News, after the show was canceled, she worked as a field reporter for Geo News in 2008. Maria later worked at Geo News as an anchor and has hosted the Meray Mutabiq show with TV journalists Hassan Nisar and Sohail Warraich. After seven years of association with Geo until 2015, Maria Memon too joined the much-hyped newly launched channel Bol TV in 2015, and then she too left before the channel went on air.

After that, she joined ARY News in August 2015. She made her Lollywood debut with the animated film Tick Tock. She worked as a voice-over artist in an animated film Tick Tock with other Pakistani actors including Ahsan Khan and Ghulam Mohiuddin.

Originally she joined Geo TV as a program coordinator, but the project got shelved and her management shifted her to the newsroom and thus Maria began her journey as an anchor/reporter. She always knew that she wanted to make a difference, and her employers provided her the perfect platform to reach out to millions of people and raise awareness about the burning issues of our society.

One of the high points of her life was being selected as a CNN Journalism fellow in 2011. She was handpicked by GEO TV to represent them in Atlanta, Georgia in 2011. Her area of interest included social and human interest issues. She can proudly say that through her stories, funds have been raised for poor unwell kids, schools, and for flood relief activities.
In her journalistic career, she has had hands-on field reporting on sports as well as reporting on bomb blasts and humanitarian issues. She covered the Swat operation in 2009. Her trip to KPK took her to the IDP camps in Mardan, whereas in 2010, she covered the post-flood humanitarian crisis in Swat as well. She has conducted live infield bulletins from Data Darbar and Model Town, Lahore sites, which were bombed by the terrorists in 2010.

Apart from that, Maria Memon used to co-host a two-hour-long weekend morning show known as ‘Geo Pakistan’ every Saturday and Sunday. The show not only covered socio-political issues but went on to successfully complete over 100 episodes.

Personal life 
Memon was born in a military family. She graduated with a degree in software engineering from Hamdard University. After completing graduation, she decided on becoming an HR advisor; however, she finished up by becoming part of the TV industry as a journalist. Despite her huge success in the profession of TV reporting, Maria didn't require any proper training in news coverage to accomplish her present status. With her enthusiasm for her work and a sharp capacity to follow the steps of her mentors and guides; she rose to the top in her field. Maria is married to Umar Riaz. They got married in February, 2017. Their wedding ceremony was attended by numerous other columnists and friends of Maria Memon.

In May 2020, Maria Memon tested positive for Coronavirus disease 2019 and stated that she only had mild symptoms but decided to keep herself isolated. She was quoted as saying, "It is very important to discourage social stigma related to COVID. Be socially responsible. Isolate, get tested and let people know your condition."

References

External links
 Maria Memon's official Twitter page
 
 

Living people
Pakistani television talk show hosts
Pakistani women journalists
Geo News newsreaders and journalists
Memon people
ARY News newsreaders and journalists
BOL Network people
Women television journalists
People from Karachi
1986 births